Wolfram Wuttke (17 November 1961 – 1 March 2015) was a German professional footballer who played as a midfielder.

Club career 
Wuttke made his Bundesliga debut in October 1979 for Schalke 04 in a 3–0 win against Werder Bremen. From 1981 to 1982, he played one and a half seasons for Borussia Mönchengladbach before returning to Schalke. In summer 1983, he moved to Hamburger SV. Günther Netzer, then Hamburg's sporting director, called him one of the greatest German football talents of all times. After several disputes, Ernst Happel, Hamburg's manager, threw him out of the team in September 1985. After that, he played nearly four seasons for 1. FC Kaiserslautern. Kaiserslautern canceled his contract in 1990 due to "unprofessional behaviour" and so he joined RCD Espanyol. In 1992, he returned to the Bundesliga and played for 1. FC Saarbrücken but he had to end his career at the age of 31 due to a fracture of the shoulder. He appeared in nearly 300 (West) German top-flight matches.

International career 
His good performance in the Bundesliga earned him four caps in the West Germany national team and he was part of West Germany's squad at the UEFA Euro 1988 and the West German team that won the bronze medal at the 1988 Summer Olympics.

Death
On 1 March 2015, he died due to a multisystem organ failure caused by cirrhosis.

Honours
1. FC Kaiserslautern
 DFB-Pokal: 1989–90

Germany U21
 UEFA Under-21 Championship: runner-up 1982
 Olympics: Bronze Medal 1988

References

External links
 
 
 
 

1961 births
2015 deaths
People from Castrop-Rauxel
Sportspeople from Münster (region)
German footballers
German expatriate footballers
German expatriate sportspeople in Spain
Expatriate footballers in Spain
Association football midfielders
Germany under-21 international footballers
Germany international footballers
FC Schalke 04 players
Borussia Mönchengladbach players
Hamburger SV players
1. FC Kaiserslautern players
RCD Espanyol footballers
1. FC Saarbrücken players
Bundesliga players
La Liga players
Segunda División players
UEFA Euro 1988 players
Olympic footballers of West Germany
West German footballers
Olympic bronze medalists for West Germany
Footballers at the 1988 Summer Olympics
Olympic medalists in football
Alcohol-related deaths in Germany
Medalists at the 1988 Summer Olympics
Footballers from North Rhine-Westphalia